Goldberg Weisman Cairo is a Chicago, Illinois law firm established in 1978 by founding partners Michael B. Goldberg and Larry E. Weisman.  Two years later, Louis C. Cairo joined the firm and would become its third name partner.Goldberg Weisman Cairo has thirty-three attorneys.  The firm concentrates its practice in personal injury, workers' compensation, wrongful death, and medical malpractice law and has achieved record amounts in verdicts and settlements for its clients, totaling over one billion dollars.

Notable cases

$4.25 million verdict on behalf of the family of a woman who was killed after a semitrailer truck hit her as she stood in a traffic lane on the Indiana Toll Road.
Secured the largest verdict against a school district in the history of McHenry County, Illinois, and the highest personal injury verdict in McHenry County for the past ten years on behalf of an injured motorist who had been hit by a school bus.
$10 million settlement on behalf of a carpenter who fell to his death through an elevator shaft while working on a Chicago high-rise construction site.
$2.84 million verdict on behalf of a painter who severely injured his heel after falling from a lift at a school construction site.  The verdict was the largest verdict ever recorded for a personal injury case in Jo Daviess County, Illinois.
Sued The Arbor Nursing Home of Itasca, Illinois on behalf of one patient who had frozen to death in the nursing home's courtyard. An employee of the nursing home was charged with criminal neglect of a long-term care facility resident, criminal neglect of an elderly person, and obstruction of justice in connection with the incident.
$5.7 million settlement on behalf of a woman who was killed in a Salvation Army van crash that claimed eleven lives.
$4.6 million settlement on behalf of two brothers, one of whom was injured and the other killed, in connection with a construction accident that occurred in Tinley Park, Illinois.

References

External links
Goldberg Weisman Cairo Website
GWC Construction Accident Website
GWC Workers' Compensation Website

Law firms established in 1978
Law firms based in Chicago